This is a list of monitors of the Imperial Russian Navy and Soviet Navy of Russia and the Soviet Union.

Imperial Russian Navy
Uragan class (1863)
Smerch
Charodeika class (1866)
Admiral Lazarev class (1866)
Admiral Spiridov class
Petr Veliky (1870)
Novgorod (1874)
Taifun-class river monitors (1907)

Soviet Navy
Udarnyy
Aktivnyy
Zheleznyakov class
Vidlitsa class Incomplete
Khasan class
Zhitomir class ex-Polish Navy
Smolensk ex-Polish Navy
Azov class ex-Romanian Navy
Berdyansk ex-Romanian Navy
Izmail ex-Romanian Navy
Kerch ex-Romanian Navy
Yaz class
Piyavka class
Vosh class
Shmel class

References

Ships of the Imperial Russian Navy
Ships of the Soviet Navy